Typhonium russell-smithii is a species of plant in the arum family that is endemic to Australia.

Etymology
The specific epithet russell-smithii honours ecologist Jeremy Russell-Smith for his contributions to the knowledge of the flora and vegetation of the Top End of the Northern Territory.

Description
The species is a deciduous, geophytic, perennial herb, which sprouts from a corm about 3 cm in diameter. The leaves are deeply and narrowly trilobed. The flower is enclosed in a spathe about 6.5 cm long.

Distribution and habitat
The species is known only from Cannon Hill in Kakadu National Park, in the tropical Top End of the Northern Territory, where the type collection came from sandy colluvial soils in eucalypt forest at the base of the Kakadu escarpment.

References

 
russell-smithii
Monocots of Australia
Flora of the Northern Territory
Plants described in 1993
Taxa named by Alistair Hay